Southorpe Roughs is a  Site of Special Scientific Interest west of Southorpe in Cambridgeshire.

This is a disused quarry which has grassland on Jurassic limestone. The main grasses are tor-grass and sheep's fescue, and there are the nationally rare plants spotted cat's ear and pasque flower.

The site is private land with no public access.

References

Sites of Special Scientific Interest in Cambridgeshire